Green Concorde is a Danish indie rock band, founded in 2003. On 8 September 2009 the band members announced on their Myspace-profile  that they would no longer be playing together as Green Concorde.

History
On the remainders of The Bella Rocca Band, four musically likeminded, yet personally diverse guys formed Green Concorde in October 2003. From their base in Nørrebro, an area of Danish Capitol Copenhagen with a lively multi-ethnic culture and a history of riots between squatters and police, the band started writing songs inspired by their surroundings.

Outside Denmark, Green Concorde has played venues in Germany, the Netherlands, France and Norway.

Discography

9-Song Split

In 2004 the band released a split-CD with the Dutch instrumentalist post-rock band We vs Death. On this album, released on Morningside Records (Denmark), Zabel Muziek (Netherlands) and Eglantine Records (France), appeared the following Green Concorde songs:
Ten Cities of Green Concorde
2:26
This Time
Yellow Raincoats
Detroit
Two Red Chairs

Ten Cities
The band released their full-length debut in January 2007. The CD and LP was released on Bonnier Amigo Music (Denmark) and Pop-U-Loud (GAS), and contained eleven tracks:
This Time
The Anthem To Which We Fall
We Set Sail By The Way We Feel
Detroit
Rooster
Toxic Symphony
Fireside
Ten Cities Of Green Concorde
2:26
Angel Food
Catch And Turn

Down The Corridor To The Exit Through The Gates Out Into Safety
The band's second full-length came out in March 2009 on CD and vinyl. The album was released on Target Records (Denmark) and Pop-U-Loud (GAS), and contained nine tracks:
Flowers Of Romance
Planet WWX (WWX may be a reference to World War 10)
After Love (Nothing Else Will Do)
Silvercoated Buildings
Silence And Glass
Neu
Arrows On Fire
Death

Line up
The members were:
Peter Skaanning Opstrup (bass)
Carsten Hebsgaard Nielsen (guitar)
Morten Espersen Dam (vocals and guitar)
Simon Lund-Jensen (drums)

New Projects
Peter Skaanning Opstrup: Sort
Carsten Hebsgaard Nielsen: War Drums
Morten Espersen Dam: No Blood in Bones

External links
Green Concorde on Myspace 

Danish indie rock groups